Tsakalonisi is a small Greek island in the Ionian Sea, part of the Echinades archipelago. As of 2011, it had no resident population. It is situated 0.3 km west of Provati, 0.8 km southwest of Karlonisi, 1 km southeast of Drakonera, 4 km off the coast of Aetolia-Acarnania and 27 km east of Ithaca. It is administered by the municipality of Cephalonia.

References

Islands of the Ionian Islands (region)
Landforms of Ithaca
Islands of Greece
Landforms of Cephalonia
Echinades